Gate Helmsley is a village and civil parish in the Ryedale district of North Yorkshire, England, about seven miles east of York. The village lies on the border with the East Riding of Yorkshire.

History

The village is mentioned in the Domesday Book as Hamelsec in the Bulford hundred and as a possession of the Archbishop of York.

Gate Helmsley was served by Holtby railway station on the York to Beverley Line between 1847 and 1939.

Governance

The village lies within the Thirsk and Malton UK Parliament constituency. It also lies within the Hovingham & Sheriff Hutton electoral ward of North Yorkshire County Council and the Ryedale South West ward of Ryedale District Council.

Geography

The 1881 UK Census recorded the population as 204. According to the 2001 UK Census the population was 291, of which 207 were over the age of sixteen and of those, 127 were in employment. There were 104 dwellings, of which 54 were detached. By the time of the 2011 census the population had increased to 325.

The nearest settlements are Upper Helmsley  to the north; Warthill  to the west; Low Catton  to the south-east and Stamford Bridge  to the east. The village stands alongside the A166 that forms part of the boundary between North Yorkshire and the East Riding of Yorkshire. The road used to be a turnpike. The soil is sandy on top of beds of Keuper Marls and Bunter Sandstone.

Religion

There is a church in the village dedicated to St Mary and is a Grade II Listed Building. The small Wesleyan Chapel next to St Mary's Church still stands.

Notable buildings

In addition to the Church of St Mary, there are six other Grade II Listed buildings including the local public house.

References

Villages in North Yorkshire
Civil parishes in North Yorkshire